Rucci is a surname. Notable people with the surname include:

 José Ignacio Rucci, an Argentine union leader and politician
 Michelangelo Rucci, an Australian sports journalist, and writer
 Michele Rucci, a biomedical engineer and neuroscientist 
 Ralph Rucci, an American fashion designer and artist
 Todd Rucci, a former professional American football player